Comarch is a Polish multinational software house and systems integrator based in Kraków, Poland. Comarch provides services in areas such as Telecommunications, Finance and Banking, the Services Sector and to Public Administration. Its services include billing, Enterprise Resource Planning (ERP) systems, IT security, IT architecture, management and outsourcing solutions, Customer Relationship Management (CRM) and sales support, electronic communication and business intelligence and cloud solutions for various businesses. Janusz Filipiak and his wife Elżbieta Filipiak (chairman of the supervisory board) are the main shareholders of the company.

History
Comarch was founded in 1993 by professor Janusz Filipiak, a tenured scientist on leave from AGH University of Science and Technology in Kraków. Since then the company has built an international network of subsidiaries. Today, the Comarch Group employs more than 6500 employees in 30 countries around the world with a steady yearly revenue stream of over $300 million. In 2014, company opened offices in Chile and Spain. In 2015, a company was established in Malaysia, Sweden and Italy, in 2016 companies from Argentina, Colombia and Peru joined, and in 2017 branches in Saudi Arabia started operating.

Comarch is a publicly held corporation, listed on the main market of the Warsaw Stock Exchange and the total value of the company's shares on June 12, 2006 exceeded PLN 1 billion. The Comarch Corporate Group comprises international branches (such as Comarch AG, Comarch S.A.S., Comarch, Inc. and others) and Kraków football club MKS Cracovia SSA. SoInteractive, an engagement and gamification provider, is an associated company. On April 27, 2012, Comarch purchased 100% shares of Esaprojekt. On July 21, 2015 Comarch acquired 42.5% of the shares of the American company Thanks Again LLC specializing in loyalty solutions and CRM systems. In 2016, Comarch exported its own products and services worth PLN 661.1 million, which accounts for almost 60% of total revenues. In November 2017, Comarch won tender for maintenance of the KSI system for ZUS. On April 4, 2017, Comarch acquired 100% of shares in the Polish company Geopolis.

See also
Economy of Poland

References

Companies based in Kraków
Polish companies established in 1994
Companies listed on the Warsaw Stock Exchange
Customer relationship management software companies
ERP software companies
Information technology companies of Poland
Multinational companies headquartered in Poland
Software companies of Poland
Polish brands
Manufacturing companies established in 1994